Aichi Prefecture is a prefecture of Japan in the Chūbu region.

Aichi may also refer to:

Aichi District, Aichi, district in Aichi Prefecture, Japan
Aichi, Iran, a village in Kurdistan Province, Iran
Aichi (surname)
Aichi Sendou, protagonist of the media franchise Cardfight!! Vanguard
Aichi Steel, Japanese steel manufacturing company
Aichi University, university in Aichi Prefecture, Japan
5908 Aichi, main-belt asteroid
Aiways, a Chinese electric car manufacturer

See also
Aichi Kokuki, Japanese aircraft manufacturing company